Jean-Emmanuel Nédra (born 11 March 1993 in Le Lamentin, Martinique) is a professional footballer who plays as a midfielder for Golden Lion in the Martinique Championnat National and internationally for Martinique.

He made his debut for Martinique in 2012. He was in the Martinique Gold Cup squad for the 2017 tournament. He started in the defeat against Panama and the win against Nicaragua, also appearing as a substitute in the 3-2 defeat to the USA.

On 31 December 2022, Nédra and his girlfriend have been caught in Charles de Gaulle Airport, Paris carrying luggages filled with 50.7kg and 53 kg of cocaine.

References

1993 births
Living people
Martiniquais footballers
Martinique international footballers
Association football midfielders
People from Le Lamentin
2017 CONCACAF Gold Cup players